Mionochroma is a genus of beetles in the family Cerambycidae, containing the following species:

 Mionochroma aterrimum (Gounelle, 1911)
 Mionochroma aureotinctum (Bates, 1870)
 Mionochroma carmen Napp & Martins, 2009
 Mionochroma chloe (Gounelle, 1911)
 Mionochroma decipiens (Schmidt, 1924)
 Mionochroma electrinum (Gounelle, 1911)
 Mionochroma elegans (Olivier, 1790)
 Mionochroma equestre (Gounelle, 1911)
 Mionochroma flachi (Schwarzer, 1923)
 Mionochroma novella (Bates, 1885)
 Mionochroma ocreatum (Bates, 1870)
 Mionochroma pseudovittatum (Schwarzer, 1923)
 Mionochroma rufescens (Gahan, 1895)
 Mionochroma rufitarse (Schwarzer, 1929)
 Mionochroma spinosissimum (Schmidt, 1924)
 Mionochroma subaurosum (Zajciw, 1966)
 Mionochroma subnitescens (Gounelle, 1911)
 Mionochroma vittatum (Fabricius, 1775)
 Mionochroma wilkei (Schmidt, 1924)

References

Callichromatini